Streltsov is a 2020 Russian biographical sports drama film directed by Ilya Uchitel.

It was theatrically released in Russia on 24 September 2020 by Central Partnership.

Plot 
The film tells about the Soviet footballer, Eduard Streltsov, and his difficult path to national fame.

Cast

Production

See also
 In the constellation of Streltsov (2017 TV mini-series)

References

External links 
 

2020 films
2020s Russian-language films
2020 biographical drama films
2020s sports drama films
Russian biographical drama films
Russian sports drama films
Russian association football films
Russian romantic drama films
Sports films based on actual events
Drama films based on actual events
Russian biographical films
Biographical films about sportspeople
Films set in Moscow
Films set in the Soviet Union